Ngarnang (Chinese: 阿朗; Pinyin: Ālǎng) is a village and township-level division of Lhünzhub County, in the Lhasa Prefecture of the Tibet Autonomous Region of China.

See also
List of towns and villages in Tibet

Populated places in Lhasa (prefecture-level city)
Township-level divisions of Tibet
Lhünzhub County